Loriciel (also sometimes Loriciels) was a French video game developing company that was active from 1983 to the early 1990s. The name is a combination of logiciel, the French word for software, and Oric which was the first computer they wrote software for.

During the 1980s, they developed games for various systems (Oric 1, ZX81, ZX Spectrum, Amstrad CPC, Thomson computers and the Atari ST). The first game that Loriciel developed was Hubert for the Commodore 64. They managed to publish 150 different games within their short lifespan as a company. While several attempts were made to revive the company (first as Loriciel then Virtual Studio), financial difficulties would force this company to shut down after developing Tommy Moe's Winter Extreme: Skiing & Snowboarding for the Super Nintendo Entertainment System.

Video games

Personal computers

Amstrad CPC
 Empire (1985)
 Dianne (1985)
 Rally II (1985)
 Foot Marius Tresor (1985)
 Le 5eme Axe (1985)
 Tony Truand (1985)
 Orphée: Le Voyage Aux Enfers (1985)
 Le Mystère De Kikekankoi (1985)
 Le Diamant De L'ile Maudite (1985)
 Planete Base (1985)
 Torann (1985)
 3D Fight (1985)
 Lorigraph (1985)
 Pearl Harbour (1985)
 Bob Winner (1986)
 Pouvoir (1986)
 Marche Commun (1986)
 Reversi Champion (1986)
 Bactron (1986)
 Top Secret (1986)
 Sapiens (1986)
 Le Pacte (1986)
 Les Templiers D'Orven (1986)
 MGT: The Magnetik Tank (1986)
 Billy La Banlieue 1 (1986)
 L'Aigle d'Or (1986)
 Infernal Runner (1986)
 Des chiffres et des lettres (1987)
 Mata Hari (1988)
 Space Racer (1988)
 Skweek (1989)
 Disc (1990)
 Moon Blaster (1990)
 Quadrel (1991)
 Super Skweek (1991)
 Bumpy's Arcade Fantasy (1992)
 Jim Power in Mutant Planet (1992)
 Tennis Cup II (1992)
 Tiny Skweeks (1992)

Amstrad PCW
 Orphée: Le Voyage Aux Enfers (1985)

Atari ST
 Magnetic Tank (1986)
 Quasar (1986)
 Bob Winner (1987)
 Sapiens (1987)
 Mach 3 (1987)
 Mission (1987)
 Space Racer (1988)
 Turbo Cup (1988)
 Mata Hari (1988)
 Bumpy (1989)
 Westphaser (Steve McQueen) (1989)
 A320 (1989)
 Sherman M4 (1989)
 Pinball Magic (1989)
 Tennis Cup (1989)
 Skweek (1989)
 Moon Blaster (1990)
 Quadrel (1991)
 Disc (1990)
 Super Skweek (1990)
 Time Race (1990)
 Builderland (1990)
 Out Board (1990)
 Dark Sat (1990)
 Harricana - Raid International Motoneige' (1990)
 Gem Stone Legend (1990)
 Guardians (1991)
 Booly (1991)
 Baby Jo in Going Home (1991)
 D-Day (1992)
 Bumpy's Arcade Fantasy (1992)
 Jim Power in Mutant Planet (1992)
 Tennis Cup II (1992)
 Tiny Skweeks (1992)

Commodore 64
 Hubert (1983)
 Jeep (1983)
 Bounzy (1983)
 Bob Winner (1986)
 Infernal Runner (1986)
 Magnetik Tank (1986)
 Des Chiffres et des Lettres (1987)
 Downhill Challenge (1987)
 Space Racer (1988)

Amiga
 Space Racer (1988)
 Skweek (1989)
 Disc (1990)
 Moon Blaster (1990)
 Quadrel (1991)
 Super Skweek (1991)
 Baby Jo in Going Home (1991)
 Bumpy's Arcade Fantasy (1992)
 Jim Power in Mutant Planet (1992)
 Tennis Cup II (1992)
 Tiny Skweeks (1992)
 Entity (1993)
 The Cartoons (1993)

MS-DOS
 Orphée: Voyage aux Enfers (1985)
 Top Secret (1985)
 Bob Winner (1986)
 Magnetik Tank (1986)
 Quasar]] (1986)
 Sapiens (1986)
 Tera: La Cité des Crânes (1986)
 Des chiffres et des lettres (1987)
 Cobra (1987)
 Mach 3 (1987)
 Mission (1987)
 Space Racer (1988)
 Turbo Cup (1988)
 Crazy Shot (1989)
 Sherman M4 (1989)
 Skweek (1989)
 Moon Blaster (1990)
 Panza Kick Boxing (1990)
 Pinball Magic (1990)
 Quadrel (1990)
 Time Race (1990)
 Golden Eagle (1991)
 The Brainies (1991)
 Paragliding (1991)
 Best of the Best: Championship Karate (1992)
 Booly (1991)
 Bumpy's Arcade Fantasy (1992)
 Psyborg (1992)
 D-Day (1992)
 Tennis Cup II (1992)
 Entity (1993)
 Jim Power: The Lost Dimension in 3-D (1993)

MSX
 Maze Max (1985)
 Echec (1985)
 Infernal Miner (1985)
 Loriciels Runner (1986)
 Mach 3 (1987)
 Bumpy (1989)

Macintosh
 Targhan (1989)

Matra Alice
 La Chenille Infernale (1984)
 Galaxion (1984)

Oric
 3D (1983)
 Carn-3 (1983)
 Caspak (1983)
 Dico 5 (1983)
 Fromage (1983)
 Galaxion (1983)
 Gastronon (1983)
 Gencar (1983)
 Godill'oric (1983)
 Hu*Bert (1983)
 Hyper Master Mind (1983)
 Intertron (1983)
 Jackman (1983)
 La Chenille infernale (1983)
 Le Manoir du Docteur Génius (1983)
 Le Mystère de Kikekankoi (1983)
 Le Protector (1983)
 Moniteur (1983)
 Moniteur V1.0 (1983)
 Moniteur/Ass/Désass (1983)
 Orion (1983)
 Ovni (1983)
 Pengoric (1983)
 Poker (1983)
 Puissance 4 (1983)
 Annuaire (1984)
 Assembleur Symbolique (1984)
 BASIC Francais (1984)
 Budget Familial (1984)
 Calcul Mental (1984)
 Calculus (1984)
 CAO (1984)
 Challenge Voile (1984)
 Citadelle (1984)
 Course aux lettres (1984)
 Crocky (1984)
 Doggy (1984)
 Editeur Musical (1984)
 Flipper (1984)
 Frelon (1984)
 Gestion de Stock (1984)
 Intox et Zoé (1984)
 J'apprends l'Anglais (1984)
 J'apprends la CAO (1984)
 L'Aigle d'or (1984)
 Las Vegas (1984)
 Le Diamant de l'ile maudite (1984)
 Le Général (1984)
 Le Retour du Docteur Génius (1984)
 Lorigraph (1984)
 Lotoriciels (1984)
 Reversi Champion (1984)
 Sorvivor (1984)
 Stanley (1984)
 Super Jeep (1984)
 Tendre Poulet (1984)
 Tic Tac (1984)
 Vision (1984)
 3D Fongus (1985)
 3D Munch (1985)
 Jimmy Poubelle (1985)
  Logo V1.0 (1985)
 Le Secret du tombeau (1985)
 Loritel (1985)
 Star (1985)
 Vortex (1985)

Philips VG5000
 Citadelle (1984)

SG-1000
 Crocky (1984)
 Kamikaze (1984)

ZX Spectrum
 Course aux Lettres (1984)
 Jeu de Dames (1984)

Sinclair ZX81
 Tennis (1984)
 Traffic (1984)

Thomson MO5/MO6
 Bob Winner Calcul Mental (1984)
 Challenge Voile (1984)
 Coliseum Course aux Lettres (1984)
 Eliminator (1984)
 The Fifth Axis Intox et Zoé (1984)
 Jeu de Dames (1984)
 K.Y.A. L'Aigle d'Or Mach 3 Mon Général Monte-Carlo (1984)
 Pulsar II Rodeo Sapiens Space Racer Tic Tac (1984)
 Top Chrono Vision (1984)
 Yeti (1984)

Thomson TO7/TO8
 Bactron Bob Winner Challenge Voile Cobra Coliseum Course aux Lettres Eliminator The Fifth Axis K.Y.A. L'Aigle d'Or Mach 3 Magnetik Tank MGT + Bactron Mission Mon Général Pulsar II Rodeo Sapiens Space Racer Turbo Cup YetiNintendo

Game Boy
 Best of the Best: Championship Karate (1992)

NES
 Best of the Best: Championship Karate (1992)

Super NES
 Best of the Best: Championship Karate (1992)
 International Tennis Tour (1993)
 Jim Power: The Lost Dimension in 3-D (1993)
 Tommy Moe's Winter Extreme: Skiing & Snowboarding (1994)

Sega

Game Gear
 Skweek (1991)

Genesis/Mega Drive
 Best of the Best: Championship Karate (1992)
 Davis Cup Tennis (1993)
 Jim Power: The Lost Dimension in 3-D (1993)

PC Engine

HuCard
 Skweek (1991)

CD-ROM²
 Builderland: The Story of Melba (1990)
 Baby Jo in: Going Home (1992)
 Jim Power in Mutant Planet'' (1992)

References

External links
  http://www.loriciel.net/ An exhaustive web site about Loriciels.
 MobyGames
  http://cpcrulez.fr/games-company-LORICIELS-un_editeur_ce_presente_CC.htm Loriciels - Un éditeur ce présente

Defunct video game companies of France
Video game companies established in 1983
Video game companies disestablished in 1995
Video game development companies
French companies disestablished in 1995
French companies established in 1983
Video game publishers